Helicia calocoma is a species of plant in the family Proteaceae. It is endemic to Papua New Guinea.  It is threatened by habitat loss.

References

Flora of Papua New Guinea
calocoma
Vulnerable plants
Taxonomy articles created by Polbot